Cácio de Souza Costa (born 11 February 1995), also known as Cácio Souza, is a Brazilian born East Timorese football player.

International career
Cácio made his senior international debut against Brunei national football team in the 2014 AFF Championship qualification on 12 October 2014.

References

External links
 

1995 births
Living people
East Timorese footballers
Timor-Leste international footballers
Association football defenders
East Timorese expatriate footballers
Brazilian emigrants to East Timor